Baganaha is a village development committee in Bardiya District in Lumbini Province of south-western Nepal. At the time of the 2011 Nepal census it had a population of 13,048 people living in 2,482 individual households. There were 6,188 males and 6,860 females at the time of census.

References

Populated places in Bardiya District